Marlor is a surname. Notable people with the surname include:

 John Marlor (1789–1835), American architect
 Rothwell Marlor (1893–1954), English rugby league player

See also
 Marler
 Marlo